Ethel Ana del Rosario Jara Velásquez (born 11 May 1968) is a Peruvian lawyer and politician who was Prime Minister of Peru from July 2014 to April 2015.

Early life 

Ana Jara was born in Ica on May 11, 1968. She attended elementary school at I.E. No. 22494 Juan XXIII and high school in Antonia Moreno de Cáceres School located in the same city.

She studied Law and Political Science at the Saint Aloysius Gonzaga National University in Ica. Likewise, the Master of Law studies, with a mention in Civil and Commercial Law, culminated in the Graduate School of the same university. She has a PhD in Law.

In 1998, she began to practice as a notary public in Ica. She was secretary of the Mutual Fund of Peruvian Notaries (2000–2001), member of the Advisory Council of the Zone XI Registry Office (2002–2003) and Vice Dean of the College of Notaries of Ica (2005–2006).

Political career 

In 2006, she ran unsuccessfully for Congresswoman for Ica under Union for Peru and a few months later, Jara ran for Governor of Ica, placing third. Five years later, Ana Jara was elected congresswoman, representing the Nationalist-dominated Peru Wins. She was member of the board of directors and of the Permanent Commission of the Congress of the Republic, of the Audit and Justice Commissions and secretary of the Housing Commission. Likewise, he served as president of the Foreign Relations Commission.

On 11 December 2011, upon assuming the second ministerial cabinet of President Ollanta Humala chaired by Óscar Valdés, she was sworn in as Minister of Women and Social Development until 2014. On 21 January 2012, her office was renamed the Ministry of Women and Vulnerable Populations.

On 24 February 2014, she became Minister of Labor and Employment Promotion of Peru in a renewed cabinet whose presidency was assumed by René Cornejo.

After the resignation of René Cornejo, Ana Jara became president of the Council of Ministers. Her swearing-in ceremony was held on 22 July 2014, in the Golden Room of the Government Palace.

On 26 August, after two unsuccessful attempts, Jara and her ministerial cabinet obtained the vote of confidence from the Congress of the Republic.

On 20 March 2015, the opposition in Congress presented a motion of censure against the prime minister due to the intelligence service spying on politicians, business leaders, and journalists. This motion was debated on the 30th of the same month, being censored by Congress with 72 votes in favor and 42 against, and due to this she had to resign from office.

See also
 President of the Council of Ministers of Peru
 Ollanta Humala
 Peruvian Nationalist Party

References

External links

 Biografía de Ana Jara (in Spanish)
 Articles by Ana Jara in Lucidez.pe (in Spanish)

1968 births
Living people
Women members of the Congress of the Republic of Peru
People from Ica, Peru
Peruvian women lawyers
Peruvian Nationalist Party politicians
Prime Ministers of Peru
Women prime ministers
Women government ministers of Peru
21st-century Peruvian women politicians
21st-century Peruvian politicians
20th-century Peruvian lawyers
Women's ministers of Peru